Maryvonne Huet (born 1 December 1936) is a former French figure skater who competed in ladies singles.  She won the gold medal at the French Figure Skating Championships in 1954 and again in 1955.  She finished sixth at the 1955 European Figure Skating Championships and 19th at that year's World Figure Skating Championships.  She represented her country in the 1956 Winter Olympics, placing 17th.  In 1957, she captured another French Championship and came in 17th at the European Championships.

Results

References

External links
 
 

1936 births
Olympic figure skaters of France
Figure skaters at the 1956 Winter Olympics
French female single skaters
Living people
Place of birth missing (living people)